In enzymology, a thymidine-triphosphatase is an enzyme that catalyzes the chemical reaction

dTTP + H2O  dTDP + phosphate

Thus, the two substrates of this enzyme are dTTP and H2O, whereas its two products are dTDP and phosphate.

This enzyme belongs to the family of hydrolases, specifically those acting on acid anhydrides in phosphorus-containing anhydrides.  The systematic name of this enzyme class is dTTP nucleotidohydrolase. Other names in common use include thymidine triphosphate nucleotidohydrolase, dTTPase, and deoxythymidine-5'-triphosphatase.  This enzyme participates in pyrimidine metabolism.

References 

 

EC 3.6.1
Enzymes of unknown structure